The cuspy halo problem (also known as the core-cusp problem) refers to a discrepancy between the inferred dark matter density profiles of low-mass galaxies and the density profiles predicted by cosmological N-body simulations. Nearly all simulations form dark matter halos which have "cuspy" dark matter distributions, with density increasing steeply at small radii, while the rotation curves of most observed dwarf galaxies suggest that they have flat central dark matter density profiles ("cores").

Several possible solutions to the core-cusp problem have been proposed. Many recent studies have shown that including baryonic feedback (particularly feedback from supernovae and active galactic nuclei) can "flatten out" the core of a galaxy's dark matter profile, since feedback-driven gas outflows produce a time-varying gravitational potential that transfers energy to the orbits of the collisionless dark matter particles. Other works have shown that the core-cusp problem can be solved outside of the most widely accepted Cold Dark Matter (CDM) paradigm: simulations with warm or self-interacting dark matter also produce dark matter cores in low-mass galaxies. It is also possible that the distribution of dark matter that minimizes the system energy has a flat central dark matter density profile.

Simulation results

According to W.J.G. de Blok "The presence of a cusp in the centers of CDM halos is one of the earliest and strongest results derived from N-body cosmological simulations." Numerical simulations for CDM structure formation predict some structure properties that conflict with astronomical observations.

Observations

The discrepancies range from galaxies to clusters of galaxies. "The main one that has attracted a lot of attention is the cuspy halo problem, namely that CDM models predict halos that have a high density core or have an inner profile that is too steep compared to observations."

Potential solutions

The conflict between numerical simulations and astronomical observations creates numerical constraints related to the core/cusp problem. Observational constraints on halo concentrations imply the existence of theoretical constraints on cosmological parameters. According to McGaugh, Barker, and de Blok, there might be 3 basic possibilities for interpreting the halo concentration limits stated by them or anyone else:
"CDM halos must have cusps, so the stated limits hold and provide new constraints on cosmological parameters."
"Something (e.g. feedback, modifications of the nature of dark matter) eliminates cusps and thus the constraints on cosmology."
 "The picture of halo formation suggested by CDM simulations is wrong."

One approach to solving the cusp-core problem in galactic halos is to consider models that modify the nature of dark matter; theorists have considered warm, fuzzy, self-interacting, and meta-cold dark matter, among other possibilities. One straightforward solution could be that the distribution of dark matter that minimizes the system energy has a flat central dark matter density profile.

See also
 Dwarf galaxy problem (also known as "the missing satellites problem")
 List of unsolved problems in physics

References

Dark matter
Unsolved problems in physics